Sébastien Verhulst (19 February 1907 – 20 March 1944) was a Belgian footballer who represented his nation at the 1928 Summer Olympics in the Netherlands.

References

External links
 

1907 births
1944 deaths
Belgian footballers
Association football forwards
Olympic footballers of Belgium
Belgium international footballers